Galela may refer to:

 Galela, a genus of planthoppers
 Galela (city), a city and region in Indonesia
 Galela language, a language in the West Papuan language family